Asimina obovata, the bigflower pawpaw, is a shrub or small tree in the  custard apple family. It is an endemic native to Florida, where it is found on open sandy hammocks and in dry woods. Showy white flowers in late winter to early summer are followed by large green edible fruit. Its pollen is shed as permanent tetrads. Along with the other members of the genus, it serves as a host plant for zebra swallowtail butterfly and pawpaw sphinx moth

References

obovata
Endemic flora of Florida
Flora without expected TNC conservation status